The New York Clipper, also known as The Clipper, was a weekly entertainment newspaper published in New York City from 1853 to 1924. It covered many topics, including circuses, dance, music, the outdoors, sports, and theatre. It had a circulation of about 25,000. The publishers also produced the yearly New York Clipper Annual. In 1924, The Clipper was absorbed into the entertainment journal Variety.

History
Frank Queen began publishing the New York Clipper in 1853, making it the first American paper devoted entirely to entertainment; the paper eventually shortened its name to The Clipper. The paper was one of the earliest publications in the United States to regularly cover sports, and it played an important role in popularizing baseball in the country. In addition to more popular sporting events, the New York Clipper also wrote about billiards, bowling, even chess. It began covering American football in 1880. In 1894, however, The Clipper dropped its sports coverage and devoted itself entirely to theatre.

In addition to entertainment, The Clipper regularly published short satirical pieces written in exaggerated dialects such as African American English or the speech of the New York Bowery b'hoys. For example, this letter is from a fictitious Irish travel writer named "Shamus McFudd":

After me an Tim had seen the illiphant, an exhamined his trunk to see how many klane shurts he had, we wint to see a grate big snake, wid a body the size iv a whale, a tail that wud wind 3 times around Pat Clansey's cow stable. Och! sich a monster I niver want to clap me ises on agin. His mouth was so big that he cud take me an Tim at wan swaller widout openin it at all; and when his 2 jaws cum together, the Whole house wud shake as it is had a fit iv the ager. They feed him on broiled pavin stones, an whin he takes dhrink, feth he laves the river so dhry that all the ships ran aground. The divil a wurd iv a lie I'm telling ye.

The Clipper was the paper of record for the circus business from its founding until about 1902 when the Billboard overtook it in coverage. For most of its life the paper carried a circus section and contained both classified and display advertising for circuses. It remains the single best news source for the circus in the second half of the 19th century, and is essential to circus historians. It had its competitors for circus news including the Sporting and Theatrical Journal, the New York Mercury, and the Dramatic News, all of which covered circuses to a greater or lesser degree. The Clipper is also an important source for minstrel shows and popular theater.

In 1922, Sime Silverman, the publisher of the rival newspaper Variety, acquired the Clipper and folded it 2 years later.

Today, the New York Public Library and the Library of Congress possess nearly complete collections of the newspaper. Many other research libraries have microfilm copies. Many issues are available online at fultonhistory.com, an archive of historical newspapers from New York, in the University of Illinois digital newspaper collection and at archive.org.

See also
 New York Dramatic Mirror
 Illustrated Sporting and Dramatic News
 The Morning Telegraph
 Variety

References

Further reading
 Barth, Gunther Paul (1980). City People: The Rise of Modern City Culture in Nineteenth-century America. New York: Oxford University Press.
 Description of the New York Clipper Newspaper Collection at the University of Southern California. Accessed 1 December 2005.
 "Industry Publications". Showhistory.com. Accessed 1 December 2005.
 Mahar, William J. (1999). Behind the Burnt Cork Mask: Early Blackface Minstrelsy and Antebellum American Popular Culture. University of Illinois Press.
 Oriard, Michael (1993). Reading Football: How the Popular Press Created an American Spectacle. University of North Carolina Press.
 Rader, Benjamin G. (2002). Baseball: A History of America's Game. University of Illinois Press.

External links

  Archive online of the New York Clipper
 Illinois Digital Newspaper Collections: New York Clipper (1853-1924)
 Max Morath New York Clipper collection, 1966, held by the Billy Rose Theatre Division, New York Public Library for the Performing Arts

Newspapers established in 1853
Publications disestablished in 1924
Defunct newspapers published in New York City
1853 establishments in New York (state)
1924 disestablishments in New York (state)